The Natural and Cultural Heritage of the Ohrid Region refers to two different sites:
 Natural and Cultural Heritage of the Ohrid Region (Albania), located at Pogradec on the Albanian side of Lake Ohrid
 Natural and Cultural Heritage of the Ohrid Region (Macedonia), located at Ohrid on the Macedonian side of Lake Ohrid